= NGC 5966 =

Galaxy in the constellation Boötes

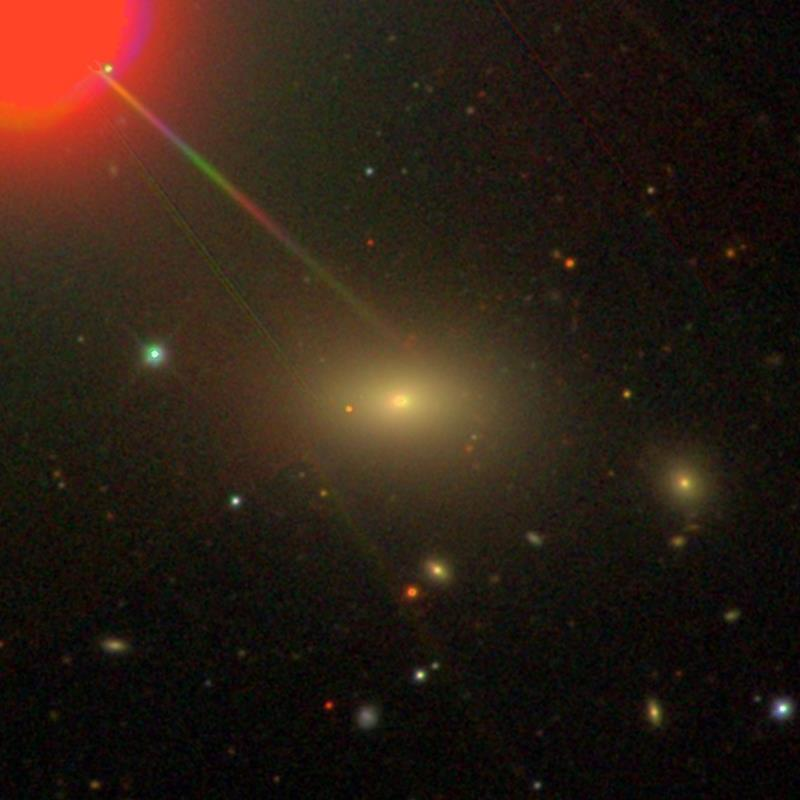
- SDSS image of NGC 5966

Observation data (J2000 epoch)
- Constellation: Boötes
- Right ascension: 15^{h} 35^{m} 52.11389^{s}
- Declination: +39° 46′ 08.0357″
- Redshift: 0.015110
- Heliocentric radial velocity: 4495.7 km/s
- Distance: 219.4 ± 15.4 Mly (67.27 ± 4.71 Mpc)
- Apparent magnitude (V): 12.22
- Apparent magnitude (B): 13.14

Characteristics
- Type: E4

Other designations
- UGC 9923, MCG +07-32-032, PGC 55552

NGC 5966 is an elliptical galaxy in the constellation Boötes. NGC 5966 is its New General Catalogue designation. The galaxy was discovered by William Herschel on March 18, 1787. Based on its redshift, it is located about 220 million light-years (67 Mpc) away from the Sun.

== Gallery ==
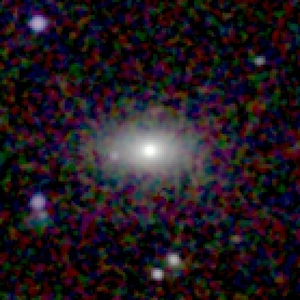
2MASS image of NGC 5966
